Gonzalo Fernández de Heredia y de Bardají (1450 - 21 November 1511) was an Aragonese monk, bishop, politician and diplomat. He was bishop-elect of Segorbe-Albarracín, then Bishop of Barcelona (1478 - 1490) and Archbishop of Tarragona (1490 - 1511). He also served as President of the Government of Catalonia (1504 - 1506).

Born in Mora de Rubielos, he was appointed Bishop of Barcelona on 8 June 1479. He was later in Rome as Ferdinand II of Aragon's ambassador to the Holy See, during which time Pope Innocent VIII made him Archbishop of Tarragona on 13 June 1490. On the election of Pope Alexander VI he was made captain of the palace guard and later governor of Rome. He left the Papal See for Naples in 1494 to become a counsellor to king Ferdinand's widow Joanna of Aragon. On 21 June 1500 he returned to his cathedral church, residing at San Miguel de Escornalbou Monastery, La Selva del Camp and Valls. He died in Valls in 1511.

References

1450 births
1511 deaths
Archbishops of Tarragona
Bishops of Barcelona
Ambassadors of Spain to the Holy See
People from Tarragona
Spanish monks